Cryptocentrus leonis is a species of goby native to marine and brackish waters along the shores of the Gulf of Thailand.

References

leonis
Endemic fauna of Thailand
Fish of Thailand
Tropical fish
Fish described in 1931